These are the 1976 Five Nations Championship squads:

Error: the links go to current squads

England

Head coach: Peter Colston

 Garry Adey
 Bill Beaumont
 Neil Bennett
 Mike Burton
 Peter Butler
 David Cooke
 Martin Cooper
 Barry Corless
 Fran Cotton
 David Duckham
 Alastair Hignell
 Mark Keyworth
 Mike Lampkowski
 Andy Maxwell
 Tony Neary (c.)
 Alan Old
 Ken Plummer
 Peter Preece
 Andy Ripley
 Mike Slemen
 Steve Smith
 Peter Squires
 Peter Wheeler
 Bob Wilkinson
 Christopher Williams
 Derek Wyatt

France

Head coach: Jean Desclaux

 Jean-Michel Aguirre
 Jean-Luc Averous
 Jean-Pierre Bastiat
 René Berges-Cau
 Roland Bertranne
 Gérard Cholley
 Michel Droitecourt
 André Duterbrand
 Jacques Fouroux (c.)
 Jean-François Gourdon
 Francis Haget
 Jean-François Imbernon
 Alain Paco
 Michel Palmie
 Robert Paparemborde
 Joel Pecune
 Jean-Pierre Rives
 Jean-Pierre Romeu
 François Sangalli
 Jean-Claude Skrela

Ireland

Head coach: Roly Meates

 Stephen Blake-Knox
 Joseph Brady
 Donal Canniffe
 John Cantrell
 Shay Deering
 Willie Duggan
 Anthony Ensor
 Brendan Foley
 Mike Gibson (c.)
 Tom Grace
 Ronnie Hakin
 Moss Keane
 Patrick Lavery
 Barry McGann
 Ian McIlrath
 Christopher McKibbin
 Stewart McKinney
 Arthur McMaster
 Lawrence Moloney
 Philo O'Callaghan
 Phil Orr
 John Robbie
 Harold Steele

Scotland

Head coach: Bill Dickinson

 Mike Biggar
 Gordon Brown
 Sandy Carmichael
 Alastair Cranston
 Lewis Dick
 Colin Fisher
 Bruce Hay
 Andy Irvine
 Wilson Lauder
 Alan Lawson
 David Leslie
 George Mackie
 Duncan Madsen
 Ian McGeechan
 Alastair McHarg
 Ian McLauchlan (c.)
 Doug Morgan
 Jim Renwick
 David Shedden
 Billy Steele
 Colin Telfer
 Alan Tomes
 Ron Wilson

Wales

Head coach: John Dawes

 Phil Bennett
 Terry Cobner
 Tommy David
 Gerald Davies
 Mervyn Davies (c.)
 Gareth Edwards
 Trefor Evans
 Charlie Faulkner
 Steve Fenwick
 Ray Gravell
 Mike Knill
 Allan Martin
 Graham Price
 Geoff Wheel
 J.J. Williams
 J.P.R. Williams
 Bobby Windsor

External links
1976 Five Nations Championship at ESPN

Six Nations Championship squads